Luo Wenzao, O.P. (alternately: Lou Wenzao, Lo Wen-Tsao, Lo Wenzao) (1616 – February 27, 1691) became the first Chinese priest in 1656 and the first Chinese Bishop in 1685. He was also known as Gregory Lopez in the Philippines.

Biography

Luo Wenzao was born in Fu'an, in the province of Fujian. In 1633 Luo was baptized and converted to Catholicism. After studying theology in Manila, he returned to Xiamen. He was ordained to the priesthood in 1654 and thereafter baptized over two thousand converts. 

In 1673, Pope Clement X made him Bishop but he refused. 
Then in 1679 Pope Innocent XI appointed him a second time and he was forced to accept. After his consecration in 1685, the provinces Jiangsu, Anhui, Shandong, Hebei, Shanxi, Shaanxi and Henan were under him. It has been argued that Christianity in China was transformed due to his presence as a missionary and pastor. He is the namesake of Wenzao Ursuline College of Languages in Taiwan.

References

External links 

1616 births
1691 deaths
Converts to Roman Catholicism
17th-century Roman Catholic bishops in China